Soleniscidae is an extinct family of fossil sea snails, marine gastropod mollusks in the clade Caenogastropoda. It first was seen on the 431 – 427 Ma (Silurian)  and its last recorded appearance was in Late Triassic. It is found in the America, South Asia and Asian islands, Europe, Northern edge of Africa.

References

 The Taxonomicon

Prehistoric gastropods